Andrzej Szewiński (born 20 February 1970 in Warsaw, Poland) is a former professional volleyball player (198 cm, opposite hitter), sport activist and politician. He is the son of a retired sprinter Irena Szewińska.

Career as sportsmen
From 1989/90 to 2004/05 (altogether 16 seasons) he played for AZS Częstochowa, Bipop Brescia, Maccabi Tel Aviv, Beşiktaş İstanbul and Galatasaray İstanbul.

Political activity
From 2006 to 2007 he was a councilor of the Silesian Regional Assembly from PO. In the parliamentary election in 2007 he was elected to a Senate in Częstochowa district, receiving 81,777 votes. Later he joined Civic Platform. In the parliamentary election in 2011, he won 37,471 votes and again won a seat to Senate from Częstochowa district. In 2014, he ran for the presidency of Częstochowa, taking 4th place out of 7 candidates. In 2015 he did not receive a senatorial reelection, because Artur Warzocha defeated him. On 30 December 2015 he replaced Krzysztof Łoziński as the vice-president of Częstochowa. In 2018 he ran unsuccessfully to the regional assembly. In the parliamentary election in 2019 he was elected to Sejm in Częstochowa district.

References

  Biography on Polish parliament website

1970 births
Living people
Polish people of Jewish descent
Polish people of Ukrainian-Jewish descent
Polish men's volleyball players
Volleyball players from Warsaw
Members of the Senate of Poland 2007–2011
Members of the Senate of Poland 2011–2015
Members of the Polish Sejm 2019–2023
Jan Długosz University alumni
Jewish Polish politicians
Galatasaray S.K. (men's volleyball) players